Haibao, meaning "jewel of the sea", is the mascot of Expo 2010, which was held in the city of Shanghai, China from May 1 to October 31, 2010.

Meaning

"Hai (海)" means the sea in Chinese inscribed from the name of the host city, and "Bao (宝,寶)" means the treasure. Its figure is in the shape of the Chinese character "Ren (人)" (meaning human). Haibao was produced by Taiwanese designer Wu Yong-jian and adopted as the official mascot of the World Expo on December 18, 2007. He was selected out of 26,655 entries as part of an international competition.

Similarities to Gumby 

It is sometimes pointed out that Haibao resembles Gumby, the green clay humanoid figure shown on American television from the 1950s–'60s. The expo's secretariat said that it is an original design and they had never heard of Gumby.

See also 

 Seymore D. Fair, mascot for the New Orleans 1984 expo
 Twipsy, mascot for the 2000 Hannover expo

Notes

External links 

 上海万博の公式マスコットキャラクター「海宝(ハイバオ)」にも盗作疑惑が浮上 FNN NEWS(Tokyo),22 April 2010 

Expo 2010
Mascots introduced in 2010
Male characters in advertising
World's Fair mascots
Chinese mascots